Alhaji Haruna Seidu is a Ghanaian politician and member of parliament for the Wenchi constituency in the Bono region of Ghana.

Early life and education 
Haruna was born on 4 February 1974 and hails from Wenchi in the Bono region of Ghana. He had his Masters in Business Administration in Marketing in 2015.

Career 
Haruna was the Marketing and Administrative Manager for Lamini Investment Ghana Limited. He is a farmer.

Political career 
Haruna is a member of NDC and currently the MP for Wenchi Constituency. He won the parliamentary seat with 26,068 votes making 51.1% of the total vote whilst the NPP parliamentary candidate George Yaw Gyan-Baffuor had 23,102 votes making 45.3% of the total votes.

Committee 
Haruna is a member of the Special Budget Committee.

Personal life 
Haruna is a Muslim.

Philanthropy 
In January 2022, he donated 36 new wheelchairs to some PWDs in the Wenchi Municipal.

References 

Living people
Ghanaian MPs 2021–2025
National Democratic Congress (Ghana) politicians
1974 births